The Mayn (meaning "The Great River") is a river in Chukotka Autonomous Okrug (Magadan Oblast) in Russia, one of the major tributaries of the Anadyr.

Course
It flows roughly northwards from its source in the small Maynskoe Lake, located in the northern part of the Parapol Valley, in the Penzhinsky Range of the Koryak Highlands. The river passes then through sparsely populated areas of the forest-tundra subzones of Chukotka. Finally it joins the right bank of the Anadyr. 

The Mayn meets the Anadyr at Ust-Mayn in the mid-lower stretch of its course, in an area of wetlands and small lakes, about  further upstream from the confluence of the Anadyr and the Belaya. All these rivers are frozen for about eight to nine months in a year between mid-October and the end of May.

There were ancient settlements in the Mayn basin. In present times Vayegi town lies in the Mayn's middle course and Ust-Mayn village at the confluence of the rivers Mayn and Anadyr. 

Administratively the whole basin of the Mayn and its tributaries belong to the Chukotka Autonomous Okrug.

Flora and fauna
The vegetation of the river basin includes mosses, lichens, dwarf shrubs, and sedge.

The chum salmon and the sockeye salmon are common in the waters of the Mayn.

See also
List of rivers of Russia

References

External links
 Chukchi People 
 Salmon
   

Rivers of Chukotka Autonomous Okrug
Koryak Mountains